Dorothy Hyman (born 9 May 1941) is a retired English sprinter. She competed at the 1960 and 1964 Summer Olympics in the 100 m, 200 m and 4 × 100 m events, winning three medals. She also won individual 100 m gold and 200 m silver at the 1962 European Championships in Belgrade and, representing England, completed the 100 yd/220 yd sprint double at the 1962 Commonwealth Games.

Winner of the 1963 BBC Sports Personality of the Year award, she has a stadium in her home village of Cudworth named in her honour. In 2011, she was inducted into the England Athletics Hall of Fame.

Early life
Hyman was born on 9 May 1941 in Cudworth, West Riding of Yorkshire, to a family of five. Her father was a coal miner and it was he who first noticed her natural talent for sprinting. She started training from the age of 13, but it took a lot of commitment because the nearest track was 8 miles away. "Each journey involved two buses," she said later. "It was a case of finish work, eat, get the bus, train, get the bus home and go to bed, each day."

Hyman established herself over the next few years as one of England's best upcoming sprinters, becoming junior champion at every age group.

Senior career
At the age of just 17 she participated in the 1958 Commonwealth Games and reached the semi-final of the 100 yd event, but more significantly she was a member of the English 4 × 110 yards relay team alongside Madeleine Weston, June Paul and anchor Heather Armitage that won the gold medal and set a new world record of 45.37 seconds in the process.

Later in 1958 she competed in the European Athletics Championships and won a silver medal as part of the English women's 4 × 100 m relay team, a result that set the platform for her to compete at a global level in the 1960 Summer Olympics.

Although Hyman was not expected to rank amongst the medallists at the Olympics, and likely not even reach the finals, she finished first in both her heat and semifinal runs for the 100 metres. In the final she led for much of the race before being overtaken by American Wilma Rudolph, finishing in second place for a silver medal. Hyman also medalled in the 200 m, finishing third.

1962–1963
It was in 1962 when Dorothy Hyman confirmed her status as one of the world's best sprinters. At the 1962 Commonwealth Games in Perth, she achieved the sprint double, winning both the 100 yd and 220 yd races. Additionally, she won a silver medal as part of the English 4 × 110 yd relay team.

At the 1962 European Championships, Hyman continued her form, winning gold in the 100 m, silver in the 200 m, and helping the English team to bronze in the 4 × 100 m relay. Hyman's winning time of 11.3 seconds in the 100 m would have been a new European record except that the wind was above permitted levels.

There were no international championships during 1963 but Hyman dominated in national events, going unbeaten in the 100 m and setting her personal best of 11.3, equalling the European record and only 0.1 outside the world record. She also set a new British record of 23.2 in the 200 m, and once again contributed to a world record in the 4 × 110 yd relay, setting a time of 45.2 on 5 August.

In recognition of her unbeaten national season and new records, Hyman was presented with the 1963 BBC Sports Personality of the Year Award.

Later career
Hyman's preparations for the 1964 Summer Olympics were derailed by injury, and as a result she could only achieve a bronze medal in the 4 × 100 m relay. Despite being only 23 years of age, Hyman retired from the track at the end of 1964. In 1965 she wrote an autobiography titled Sprint to Fame.

Hyman started to coach voluntarily at the Dorothy Hyman Track Club in Cudworth, at a stadium that had been named after her. By 1969, Hyman was reconsidering her decision to retire. She later said, "I was 24 and I felt I was ready to finish, but five years later I was running faster than I had all my life." However she had surrendered her amateur status by writing her autobiography, and so was only able to compete nationally. Despite winning some domestic events, she retired from sprinting for good soon after. "I could not run internationally so there did not seem much point in the end."

In 2011 Hyman was inducted into the England Athletics Hall of Fame.

Personal life
Hyman's father was a miner, and for 30 years, even while competing nationally, she worked as a tracer for the National Coal Board in Cudworth. She retired after publishing her book, Sprint to Fame. She currently lives in Stairfoot, Barnsley.

National titles
3-times AAA 220 yd champion (1960, 1962–1963)
2-times AAA 100 yd champion (1962–1963)
1-time AAA 100 m champion (1960)
1-time AAA 200 m champion (1969)

International competitions

Notes:
 DNS = did not start. DNF = did not finish
 All AAA results from GBR Athletics.

References

1941 births
Living people
Athletes from Yorkshire
People from Cudworth, South Yorkshire
English female sprinters
British female sprinters
Olympic athletes of Great Britain
Olympic silver medallists for Great Britain
Olympic bronze medallists for Great Britain
Olympic silver medalists in athletics (track and field)
Olympic bronze medalists in athletics (track and field)
Athletes (track and field) at the 1960 Summer Olympics
Athletes (track and field) at the 1964 Summer Olympics
Medalists at the 1960 Summer Olympics
Medalists at the 1964 Summer Olympics
Commonwealth Games medallists in athletics
Commonwealth Games gold medallists for England
Commonwealth Games silver medallists for England
Athletes (track and field) at the 1958 British Empire and Commonwealth Games
Athletes (track and field) at the 1962 British Empire and Commonwealth Games
European Athletics Championships medalists
Japan Championships in Athletics winners
BBC Sports Personality of the Year winners
Olympic female sprinters
Medallists at the 1958 British Empire and Commonwealth Games
Medallists at the 1962 British Empire and Commonwealth Games